William Franklin Jenkins (September 7, 1876 – December 4, 1961) was a justice of the Supreme Court of Georgia from 1936 to 1946, and chief justice from 1946 to 1948.

Born in Webster County, Georgia, Jenkins attended the public schools of Eatonton, Georgia and the University of Virginia. He received a law degree from the University of Georgia in 1896, and entered into the practice of law with his father in Putnam County, Georgia. He served on the Georgia Court of Appeals from 1916 to 1936, and was thereafter appointed to the state supreme court.

An avid reader of classics, Jenkins was a proponent of the Marlovian theory of Shakespeare authorship (that the plays of William Shakespeare were actually written by Christopher Marlowe).

References

External links 

 Stuart A. Rose Manuscript, Archives, and Rare Book Library, Emory University: William Franklin Jenkins family papers, 1868-1967

Justices of the Supreme Court of Georgia (U.S. state)
1876 births
1961 deaths
Chief Justices of the Supreme Court of Georgia (U.S. state)
University of Georgia School of Law alumni